Karl Müller (July 29, 1884 – April 18, 1964) was a German politician of the Christian Democratic Union (CDU) and former member of the German Bundestag.

Life 
Müller joined the Centre Party in 1908. After 1945 he participated in the building of the CDU.

In 1946/47 he was a member of the first and second appointed state parliament of North Rhine-Westphalia. In 1947 he was elected to the first freely elected state parliament, of which he was a member until 1950. Here he was deputy chairman of the CDU faction from 1947 to 1949. He was a member of the German Bundestag from 1949 to 1957. He represented the constituency of Geilenkirchen - Erkelenz - Jülich in parliament. From 12 October 1950 to 1953 he was Deputy Chairman of the Bundestag Committee for Food, Agriculture and Forestry.

Literature

References

1884 births
1964 deaths
Members of the Bundestag for North Rhine-Westphalia
Members of the Bundestag 1953–1957
Members of the Bundestag 1949–1953
Members of the Bundestag for the Christian Democratic Union of Germany
Members of the Landtag of North Rhine-Westphalia